The men's marathon swimming at the 2016 Summer Olympics in Rio de Janeiro took place on 16 August at Fort Copacabana, over a distance of 10 kilometres.

Summary
A photo finish saw Spyridon Gianniotis of Greece narrowly loses to dutchman Ferry Weertman for the gold, with both record time of 1:52:59.8 and 1:53:00.5. In the final race of his career, Gianniotis, who was also the oldest competitor at the age of 36, won the first medal for Greece in swimming since the inaugural 1896 Summer Olympics in Athens.

The battle for bronze also saw a photo finish, with France's Marc-Antoine Olivier pipping Zu Lijun and Jack Burnell on the line to finish in 1:53:02.0. Burnell was subsequently disqualified for a second yellow card for a tussle with defending champion Oussama Mellouli just before the line.

Qualification

The men's 10 km open water marathon at the 2016 Olympics featured a field of 25 swimmers:

10: the top-10 finishers in the 10 km races at the 2015 World Championships
9: the top-9 finishers at the 2016 Olympic Marathon Swim Qualifier (June 11–12, 2016 in Setúbal, Portugal)
5: one representative from each FINA continent (Africa, Americas, Asia, Europe and Oceania). (These have been selected based on the finishes at the qualifying race in Setúbal.)
1: from the host nation (Brazil) if not qualified by other means. If Brazil already contained a qualifier in the race, this spot had been allocated back into the general pool from the 2016 Olympic qualifier race.

Competition format

Unlike all of the other swimming events in the pool, the men's and women's marathon 10 kilometre races are held in open water. No preliminary heats are held, with only the single mass-start race being contested. This race is held using freestyle swimming, with a lack of stroke regulations.

Results

References

External links

Men's 10000 metre marathon
Olympics
Men's events at the 2016 Summer Olympics